The Arrow River is a short river in Otago, New Zealand. It is a tributary of the Kawarau River, which in turn feeds into the Clutha. The town of Arrowtown lies on the Arrow. A very small amount of gold was discovered by Jack Tewa in the Arrow River in August 1862. In early October much larger finds were made by John McGregor and Peter Stewart of the McGregor and Low party  and by William Fox. They disagreed over who found gold there first. It was an important part of the Central Otago Gold Rush of the 1860s.

The scene where Arwen challenged the Nazgûl while rushing Frodo to Rivendell was shot at this location for Peter Jackson's The Lord of the Rings film trilogy.

The river was originally called Haihainui- big scratches- by Māori who used to visit this area during summer for seasonal hunting (of birds) and gathering (of pounamu - greenstone).

References

Rivers of Otago
Rivers of New Zealand